Generali may refer to:

People
Generali is an Italian surname. Notable people with the surname include:

Pietro Generali (basketball), Italian basketball player
Pietro Generali, Italian composer

Other uses
Assicurazioni Generali and Generali Italia, Italian insurance companies
Generali Arena and Generali Arena (Vienna), football stadiums sponsored by Assicurazioni Generali

Italian-language surnames